Magistrates' courts in Hong Kong have criminal jurisdiction over a wide range of offenses, and in general these offenses must only constitute two years' imprisonment or a fine of HK$100,000; in certain circumstances, sentences of three years may be imposed. All criminal proceedings must begin in the magistrates' courts; the Secretary for Justice may transfer cases to either the District Court or the Court of First Instance depending on the seriousness of the crime.

All judges and magistrates must have qualified as legal practitioners either in Hong Kong or in another common law jurisdiction and have had substantial professional experience.

Court structure

Chief Magistrate 
The Chief Magistrate is the court leader and is responsible for the overall administration of the magistrates' courts.

Principal magistrate 
A principal magistrate is in charge of one of the seven magistrates' courts.

Permanent magistrate 
A permanent magistrate is a full-time magistrate, and is assigned to sit in one of the seven magistrates' courts.

The Chief Justice appoints on a temporary basis a number of principal and permanent magistrates to sit as a Master in the High Court or to sit as a Deputy District Judge or Master in the District Court, Family Court or Lands Tribunal. The Chief Justice also appoints a number of permanent magistrates to sit as Presiding Officers in the Labour Tribunal and Adjudicators in the Small Claims Tribunal.

Special magistrate 
A special magistrate is also a full-time magistrate, but is assigned to deal with various kinds of departmental summons including minor offenses such as traffic contraventions. Their sentencing power is limited to a maximum fine of HK$50,000 or as specified in their warrants of appointment.

Deputy magistrate / deputy special magistrate 
A deputy magistrate or deputy special magistrate is assigned by the Chief Justice for such period and on such terms as the chief justice thinks fit. This makes additional manpower available to the magistrates' courts while also giving eligible persons experience on the bench, before the magistrate commits to a full-time posting or returns to private practice.

List of magistrates

Chief Magistrate 

 Mr SO Wai-tak, Victor

Principal magistrates

Permanent magistrates 
The current permanent magistrates (as at 1 January 2023) are (ranked according to seniority):

Eligibility and retirement 
Since 2019, the retirement age for magistrates is 65.

List of chief magistrates since 1997

Gallery of magistrates' courts

See also 

 Judiciary of Hong Kong

Notes

References 

Judiciary of Hong Kong